MV Kaitawa was a 2,485-ton collier owned by the Union Steamship Company. She was lost with all hands on 24 May 1966 near Cape Reinga, New Zealand.

Description
The vessel was a 2,485-ton steel collier built in Leith, Scotland in 1949 by Henry Robb Limited for the Union Steam Ship Company. Kaitawa was one of three ships ordered by the company. The other two were the Kaiapoi and the Kamona. She was used primarily to bring coal from the coal fields on the West Coast, New Zealand to North Island ports. Her yard number was 375.

Kaitawa did not have an echo sounder or radar. Her British Polar twin diesel main engines were prone to cut out and stop if the collier rolled more than about 15 degrees.

Voyages
During the 1951 New Zealand waterfront dispute she was manned by Royal New Zealand Navy personnel.

Final voyage
The Kaitawa sailed with 29 crew from Westport under Captain George R Sherlock at 1.15pm on 21 May 1966 with a cargo of 2,957 tons of coal. She was bound for the Portland cement works at Whangarei via the North Cape. Her departure had been delayed because the second mate, R P Oakton, suffered appendicitis the night before and a replacement mate, M G Jenkins, had been flown in.

The seas were heavy and there was a strong  westerly gale. She hit the Pandora Bank at about 9pm. Her hold breached and the cargo of loose coal shifted causing her to capsize and sink with all hands.

Her final message at 9.18pm was:
Position (some words missing) 10 miles Cape Reinga bearing 035 (word missing) 30 degrees require immediate assistance.

On receipt of the message the Cape Horn began to retrace her journey towards where the Kaitawa was thought to be. Most of the wreckage drifted ashore at Twilight Bay (Te Paengarehia).

One body was recovered which washed up on Ninety Mile Beach.

In response to the disaster the Kaitawa relief fund was established with Auckland City Councillor and former Royal Navy officer George Forsyth as the fund's chairman.

Memorial
A memorial to the Kaitawa tragedy is located at the breakwater on the Buller River mouth near Westport. The GPS location of memorial is 41° 43.629′S, 171° 35.355′E. The memorial consists of a plaque bearing the names of the crew and an anchor (not from the Kaitawa) mounted on a round concrete plinth.

Literature
Bert Roth wrote a song about the sinking that was published in a short-lived New Zealand magazine called Fern Fire.

C. K. Stead wrote a poem ('Twenty-One Sonnets' 2) recollecting hearing the news of Kaitawas loss.

References  

1966 in New Zealand
Maritime incidents in 1966
Merchant ships of New Zealand
Ships of the Union Steam Ship Company
Shipwrecks of the Northland Region